Vasanthi B. A. (born as Karanam Vasanthi) was an Indian actress and producer who was active in the Tamil, Telugu, Malayalam and Kannada film industries during the latter half of the 20th century. She was well known for her second heroine and supporting roles in some movies.

Early life 
You may help to expand the information

Personal life 
Vasanthi married P. Seenivasan, an Indian politician of the Dravida Munnetra Kazhagam and member of the Tamil Nadu Legislative Assembly. She died on May 29, 2019, in her residence at Anna Nagar, Chennai. She was looked after by her daughter and sister's son.

Film career 
Vasanthi made her debut in Telugu movie Mahakavi Kalidasu in 1960, her Tamil debut was Then Nilavu in 1961. She also acted as second heroine opposite M. G. Ramachandran in Maadappura. Vasanthi entered the tinsel world as a well educated woman, an uncommon thing for heroines of her days (1960s). Tall, lanky and endowed with big eyes, Vasanthi acted in mostly decent characters and left a homely girl's image.

Filmography 
This list is incomplete; you can help by expanding it.

Tamil 
 Then Nilavu (1961)... Lalitha – debut in Tamil
 Maadappura (1962)...Vasantha
 Azhagu Nila (1962)
 Dakshayagnam (1962)
 Avana Ivan (1962)...Jamuna
 Bale Pandiya (1962)
 Bommai (1964)
 Ennathan Mudivu (1965)
 Sarasa B.A. (1965)

Telugu 
 Mahakavi Kalidasu (1960)...Goddess Kalika
 Siri Sampadalu (1962)...Latha
 Manchi Manasulu...Jaya
 Dakshayagnam (1962)
 Punarjanma (1963)..Vasanthi
 Anuragam (1963)
 Sabhash Suri (1964)
 Navagraha Pooja Mahima (1964)
 Gudi Gantalu (1964)...Subhadra
 Vivaha Bandham (1964)...Aruna
 Aatma Gowravam (1965)...Parvathi
 Keelu Bommalu (1965)
 Sumangali (1965)...Uma
 Palnati Yuddham (1966)...Perini Devi.
 Mangalasutram...Kamala
 Chilaka Gorinka (1966)...Saraswathi
 Veera Pooja (1968).
 Sati Sumathi (1967)...Sita

Kannada 
 Kannterudu Nodu (1961)
 Vidhi Vilasa (1962)
 Mavana Magalu (1965)
 Mruthyu Panjaradalli Goodachari 555 (1970)
 Anugraha (1971)
 Hrudaya Sangama (1972)
 Beesida Bale (1973)
 Veeranjaneya Kathe (1974)
 Pallavi (1976)

Malayalam 
 Minnaminugu (1957) – Debut in Malayalam
 Sreerama Pattabhishekam (1962)...Seeta/Ahalya
 Ammaye Kaanaan (1963)...Rema
 Kalanjukittiya Thankam (1964)...Hema
 Pakalkkinavu (1966)
 Tharavattamma (1966)
 Snehikkan Oru Pennu (1978)

As Producer 
 Memu Manushulame (1973) – Telugu
 Bhale Papa (1971) – Telugu

References

External links 

20th-century Indian actresses
Actresses in Tamil cinema
Living people
Actresses in Telugu cinema
Actresses in Malayalam cinema
Actresses in Kannada cinema
Indian film actresses
Film producers from Tamil Nadu
Indian women film producers
Year of birth missing (living people)